Al-Tuhami Club is a Saudi Arabian professional football club based in Jizan and was founded in 1948. The club also consists of various other departments including karate, taekwondo, volleyball, water polo, weightlifting and cycling. The club is one of the oldest clubs in Saudi Arabia. The club was founded by Mohammed Salem Baeshen.

References

Tuhami
Tuhami
Tuhami
Tuhami